Tapira may refer to:

Places
Tapira, Minas Gerais, Brazil
Tapira, Paraná, Brazil

Other uses
Tapira, an alternative name for Tapirira